Viktor Győző Barna (Braun) (24 August 1911 – 27 February 1972) was a Hungarian and British champion table tennis player as well as a record five times singles World Champion.

He won 41 World Championship medals and also won 20 English Open titles.

Personal life
Barna's birth name was Győző Braun, but, because of anti-Semitism in Hungary at the time, he changed his name to a Hungarian-sounding name. In September 1939, during the outbreak of the Second World War, he and his wife were in America.  Barna returned to Europe, in order to fight against the Nazis.  He joined the British army as a parachutist, and fought in Yugoslavia.  After the British withdrew from Yugoslavia, Barna remained in England.  After the war he settled with his wife in London.  He became a British national in 1952.  Later he became a representative for the Dunlop Sports Company and continued traveling the world in this capacity.  It was during one of these tours in 1972 that he succumbed to a heart attack in Lima, Peru.

His brother Tibor Barna was the 1940 Hungarian table tennis national champion.

Writing
In 1962 he published the book Table Tennis Today (London: Arthur Barker) and in 1971 Your Book of Table Tennis .
In 1957 he published the book "How to win at Table Tennis" (London: Pitman)

Hall of fame
Barna, who was Jewish, was inducted into the International Jewish Sports Hall of Fame in 1981.

Barna was inducted into the International Table Tennis Foundation Hall of Fame in 1993.

See also
 List of table tennis players
 List of select Jewish table tennis players
 List of World Table Tennis Championships medalists
 List of England players at the World Team Table Tennis Championships

References

External links

Cigarette card bio
Jewish Sports bio

1911 births
1972 deaths
Jewish table tennis players
Hungarian male table tennis players
English male table tennis players
Hungarian emigrants to England
Naturalised citizens of the United Kingdom
British Jews
Hungarian Jews
Table tennis players from Budapest
British Army personnel of World War II